An electric truck is an electric vehicle powered by batteries designed to transport cargo, carry specialized payloads, or perform other utilitarian work.

Electric trucks have serviced niche applications like milk floats, pushback tugs and forklifts for over a hundred years, typically using lead-acid batteries, but the rapid development of lighter and more energy-dense battery chemistries in the twenty-first century has broadened the range of applicability of electric propulsion to trucks in many more roles.

Electric trucks reduce noise and pollution, relative to internal-combustion trucks. Due to the high efficiency and low component-counts of electric power trains, no fuel burning while idle, and silent and efficient acceleration, the costs of owning and operating electric trucks are dramatically lower than their predecessors. According to the United States Department of Energy, the average cost per kWh capacity of battery packs for trucks fell from $500 in 2013 to $200 in 2019, and still further to $137 in 2020, with some vehicles under $100 for the first time.

Long-distance freight has been the trucking segment least amenable to electrification, since the increased weight of batteries, relative to fuel, detracts from payload capacity, and the alternative, more frequent recharging, detracts from delivery time. By contrast, short-haul urban delivery has been electrified rapidly, since the clean and quiet nature of electric trucks fit well with urban planning and municipal regulation, and the capacities of reasonably-sized batteries are well-suited to daily stop-and-go traffic within a metropolitan area.

In South Korea, electric trucks hold a noticeable share of the new truck market; in 2020, among trucks produced and sold domestically (which are the vast majority of new trucks sold in the country), 7.6% were all-electric vehicles.

History 
Autocar Trucks and several other pioneering American truck manufacturers offered a range of electric trucks for sale in the 1920s. While electric trucks were successful for short-range work, especially in cities, the higher energy-density of non-renewable fuels soon led to the decline of electric-powered trucks until battery technology advanced in the 2000s.

Types

General trucks 
A few electric general lorries prototypes or produced by small manufacturers, and often converted Diesel units, have been built until the 2000s. Trials with different companies in real-world conditions, for several months or more, have been conducted, for example with Renault, E Force and Emoss heavy-duty lorries in the 2010s. Renault launched its small electric Maxity in 2010 and Mitsubishi Fuso its slightly larger eCanter in 2017. From 2018, other major manufacturers including MAN, Mercedes-Benz and DAF began deliveries of prototypes or pre-production heavy-duty units to companies for real-world testing. In 2019, the first series production of heavy-duty lorries is expected to begin with notably Renault, Volvo and MAN.

The Futuricum Logistics 18E, first delivered in March 2021 to DPD in Switzerland, uses a 680-kWh battery and has a range of "up to" .

Delivery Trucks 
Last-mile delivery trucks are a growing segment of truck traffic with the increase in e-commerce and direct-to-consumer sales. Also known as Walk-in-Vans and box trucks, these trucks tend to be used on either fixed routes or with a fixed region for deliveries. Large buyers of these trucks include Amazon, UPS, FedEx, Bimbo, Aramark and others. With use from direct-to-consumer sales to things like linen and bread deliveries or beverage distribution, these trucks are very common. Motiv Power Systems has delivered units used by United States Postal Service and Bimbo Bakeries USA based on Ford chassis. These Motiv options have a variety of body styles from conventional manufacturers including Morgan Olson, Utilimaster, and Rockport. Lightning EMotors has delivery trucks built on the Izusu platform  BYD Auto has several truck models ranging from class 4 through 8 trucks. GM subsidiary BrightDrop is trying to develop custom solutions for this market. While many large automotive companies have made announcements about their intent to enter this market with showcases of their prototypes, the majority of vehicles on the road today are from smaller manufacturers.

Pickup trucks

In the late 1990s and early 2000s, Chevrolet produced a small series of an electric S-10 pickup truck while Ford made a certain number of Ranger EVs.

In early 2009, Phoenix Motorcars introduced a test fleet of their all-electric SUT (Sports Utility Truck) to Maui. Miles Electric Vehicles imported the Chinese-designed ZX40ST electric small pick-up in the United States in the late 2010s.

A Canadian company named Ecotuned offers an all-electric conversion of the Ford F-150; these vehicles are used by the electricity provider Hydro Quebec and Montreal Airport.

As of 2022, Ford is manufacturing the all-electric F-150 Lightning (in a new factory built next to the existing one in Dearborn) while Rivian is making the R1T all-electric pickup truck in Normal, Illinois. General Motors is making the GMC Hummer EV and has announced the Silverado EV.

Models in production include:
 JAC Shuailing i3-T330
 Dongfeng Rich 6 EV
 Dongfeng Rich EV
 JMC Yuhu 7 EV
 Great Wall Wingle 7 EV
 Jiangxi Isuzu Ruimai EV
 Rivian R1T
 Ford F-150 Lightning
 GMC Hummer EV
 Lordstown Endurance
 Radar RD6

Announced models include:
 ACE Yewt
 Tesla Cybertruck
 ZERO ZED70
 Chevrolet Silverado EV
 Fisker Alaska
 GWM POER EV
 ALPHA SUPERWOLF
 Canoo Pickup

Additionally, many Neighborhood Electric Vehicles are, or were, available as light pickup trucks.

Semi-trailer and tractor trucks

As of 2020, electric semi-trucks are in limited commercial use in California at Anheuser-Busch, GSC Logistics, Golden State Express (all using the BYD 8TT semi-tractor), Penske, and NFI (both using the Freightliner eCascadia semi-tractor).

These trucks are not limited to operation within seaports or drayage operations; their range (in the case of the BYD 8TT, 124 miles at full load and 167 miles at half load) allows use on regional routes. GSC Logistics demonstrated this by hauling cargo from the Port of Oakland, over the Altamont Pass, to Tracy, CA and back. After returning, the truck still had 40% of its battery remaining.

Volvo, DAF, MAN, Freightliner plan to begin series production of electric articulated lorries between 2019 and 2020. Tesla plans to join in 2021 with the Tesla Semi. Such vehicles are already manufactured, and sold in both the US and China, by BYD Auto (the BYD 8TT).

On 13 May 2021, Autocar Trucks announced the launch of the E-ACTT, a fully electric terminal tractor. 98 years earlier, Autocar was the first major truck manufacturer to introduce electric trucks, in 1923.

History

The Port of Los Angeles and South Coast Air Quality Management District have demonstrated a short-range heavy-duty all-electric truck capable of hauling a fully loaded  cargo container.

Economics

 of fuel is equivalent to 33.7 kWh, according to the US Department of Energy. This electric truck uses 2 kilowatt-hours per mile which is the equivalent of using only 10 kWh per every . The diesel truck that it replaces uses the equivalent of 33.7 kWh per . Thus, the diesel truck is using 3.37 times the amount of energy that the electric truck is using. Therefore, the only variables that are stopping commercial use of electric trucks are original vehicle cost and driving range, owing to the high battery pack cost and low specific energy. As mass production begins, the cost might eventually be comparable to diesel vehicles and with improvement in batteries the limited range of the electric truck might be a non-issue.

Cargo vans
As of 2022, the following models (among others) are available in Europe:
 Ford E-Transit
 Fiat E-Ducato
 Peugeot e-Boxer/Citroen e-Jumper
 Renault Master E-Tech Electric
 Mercedes eSprinter
 Maxus eDeliver 3
 Maxus eDeliver 9
 Peugeot e-Expert/Citroen e-Jumpy/Opel Vivaro-e/Toyota ProAce Electric/Fiat E-Scudo

Milk float

A common example of the battery electric trucks is the milk float. Because such vehicles make many stops, it is more practical to use an electric vehicle than a combustion truck, which would be idling much of the time; it also reduces noise in residential areas. For most of the 20th century, the majority of the world's battery electric road vehicles were British milk floats.

Garbage truck
With a similar driving pattern of a delivery vehicle like the milk float, garbage trucks are excellent candidates for electric drive. Most of their time is spent stopping, starting or idling. These activities are where internal combustion engines are their least efficient. These and other factors such as ease of driver training resulted in Birmingham City Council opting to use electric dustcarts to start replacing its horse driven carts in 1918. Its use of electric vehicles continued through a number of models including Electricar DV4s until 1971. Electric Dustcarts were also operated by Sheffield and Glasgow.

In preparation for the 2008 Olympic Games, 3,000 of the internal combustion engine garbage trucks in Beijing were replaced with lithium ion polymer battery pack electric drive trucks. The batteries were procured for about $3,300 each. In France, some all-electric garbage trucks produced by Power Vehicle Innovation have been operating since 2011 in the city of Courbevoie, the first local authorities in France to acquire them.

In September 2014, an electric garbage truck, called the ERV (electric refuse vehicle), was deployed in the US city of Chicago. It was the first of an up to $13.4 million purchase order for up to 20 trucks. The PO was won in a competitive bid by Motiv Power Systems in 2012, but only one truck was ever delivered. Chicago sued Motive in 2019, alleging the truck was inoperable more than 60% of the time.

In Europe, as of 2020, electric garbage trucks have been ordered by Geneva, Basel, Frankfurt, Duisburg and other cities. Traditional garbage trucks have extremely high fuel consumption, higher than American 18 wheelers achieve on most routes. Using an electric drive instead of a diesel engine dramatically lowers energy consumption, yet it is still around 1,900 Wh/km or 3,060 Wh/mi. With a 340-kWh battery, such a truck can still achieve a range of over 177 km (110 miles) before it needs recharging.

Off-road and mining truck
Some attempts to produce such lorries have been made; for example, one by PapaBravo. Electric mining trucks have the benefit of not polluting underground. In case of high-altitude mines, the downhill trip with ore recharges the batteries due to regenerative braking.

Solar assist 
Solar panels on tractors typically support the HVAC system, or power devices used by the driver (hotel loads). Solar panels on trailers can be used for refrigeration batteries, for liftgate batteries, or for telematics. Small solar panels mounted on a refrigeration unit can serve as trickle chargers for the refrigeration unit's starting battery.

Heemskerk Dairy combines vehicle-integrated photovoltaics with electric forklifts, to ensure quiet operations that keep livestock relaxed.

In 2022, DHL announced that installation of solar panels on the roofs of 67 of its trucks would result in cost savings and a 100kg/year reduction in carbon emissions per vehicle.

Makers and models

Retrofits 

Some companies retrofits combustion trucks to electric, because is cheaper than buying a new one, is lower operating and maintenance costs, lowest total cost of ownership (TCO) and means term extension.

Contributions

California 
In California, 70% of the smog pollution and 80% of carcinogenic diesel soot comes from the two million trucks out of 30 million registered in that state. As a remedy, California has decided to begin the clean truck standard. California has started its zero emission truck program in which they accelerate the production and deployment of electric trucks. At the end of 2021, California had 738 ZEV trucks, mostly battery powered.

An Electrified Charging Corridor Project, with 5 charging stations for medium and heavy EVs, will be completed by 2023. Chargers are already available at TEC Fontana and TEC La Mirada.

California wants 300,000 electric trucks of which 17,000 are semi trucks by 2035. By 2045, all trucks have to be electric.

South Korea
In South Korea, electric trucks hold a noticeable share of the new truck market; in 2020, among trucks produced and sold domestically (which are the vast majority of new trucks sold in the country), 7.6% were all-electric vehicles.

China 
In China, by the end of 2020, there were around 466,000 New Energy Buses (NEB) in operation, of which 378,700 buses are Battery Electric Buses (BEB), accounting for 66% and 53.8% of the total amount of buses, respectively. It is expected that 72% of China’s urban public buses are expected to be electric by 2025.

Incentives 
California Hybrid and Zero-Emission Truck and Bus Voucher Incentive Project (HVIP for short) offers up-front discounts on medium and heavy duty electric trucks.  Additionally, discounts will be increased for public transit agencies, school buses for public school districts, and vehicles operating in disadvantaged communities. For example, a public school district could receive up to $198,000 off the price of a new electric bus; a public transit agency could receive $69,000 off the price of a new Class 4 electric shuttle. Launched by the California Air Resources Board in 2009, the project is part of California Climate Investments. 

The New York Truck Voucher Incentive Program (NYTVIP) provides vouchers, or discounts, to fleets across New York State that purchase or lease medium- and heavy-duty zero-emission battery-electric vehicles (BEV). Administered by the New York State Energy Research and Development Authority (NYSERDA), NYTVIP helps make it easier for fleets to adopt zero-emission vehicle technologies by significantly reducing upfront costs. For example, purchases of the Nikola Tre BEV can qualify for an incentive valued at up to $185,000 per truck, with a scrappage requirement.

See also

 Battery electric bus
 Battery electric vehicle
 CalCars
 CarGoTram
 Charging station
 E-FORCE ONE
 Electric bus
 Electric van
 Electric vehicle conversion
 Ground support equipment
 Hybrid electric truck
 Modec
 North American Council for Freight Efficiency
 Smith Electric Vehicles
 Solar-charged vehicle
 Trolleytruck 
 VIA Motors
 Wrightspeed

References

External links

 Furrer + Frey (Opbrid) Proposes Tractor Swapping – Pony Express
 Rocky Mountain Institute announces North American Council for Freight Efficiency to help reinvent trucking and carry just as much freight on half the energy
 $600 Electric Truck Conversion
 The next five years the Electric Trucks market will register a 54.0% CAGR in terms of revenue, the global market size will reach US$ 7870 million by 2024, from US$ 590 million in 2019. ]

Battery electric vehicles